The Path may refer to:

Music 
 The Path (Carbon Based Lifeforms album), 1998
 The Path (Fit for a King album), 2020
 The Path (Show of Hands album), 2003
 "The Path", a song by HIM from their 2003 album Love Metal
 "The Path", a song by The Human Abstract from their 2008 album Midheaven
 "The Path", a song by Lorde from her 2021 album Solar Power

Television 
 "The Path" (The Twilight Zone), 2002 episode of the series
 The Path (TV series), a 2016 series

Other 
 The Path (book), a collection of essays by Konosuke Matsushita
 The Path (comics), an American comic book series by CrossGen Entertainment
 The Path (video game), a horror PC game

See also
Path (disambiguation)
PATH (disambiguation)